The Episcopal Conference of Guatemala is the Roman Catholic Episcopal Conference of Guatemala. The CEG is a member of the Latin American Episcopal Conference and the Central Episcopal Secretariat of America (CESA).

See also
Catholic Church in Guatemala

References

External links
 http://www.iglesiacatolica.org.gt/

Guatemala
Catholic Church in Guatemala

it:Chiesa cattolica in Guatemala#Conferenza_episcopale